The 1994–95 Wills Triangular Series was a One Day International cricket tournament played entirely in Pakistan. It was held in October, with players from Australia, South Africa and Pakistan. Tournament started with the match between Australia and South Africa. In the final, Australia defeated Pakistan by 64 runs to win the tournament.

Using the round robin format, each team played the others three times, before top two teams reaching the final.

Group stage

Points table

Fixtures

1st match

2nd match

3rd match

4th match

5th match

6th match

7th match

8th match

9th match

Final

Statistics

Batting
Most runs

Bowling
Most wickets

References

External links
 http://www.espncricinfo.com/ci/content/series/60960.html

International cricket competitions in Pakistan
International cricket competitions from 1994–95 to 1997